Boge may refer to:

a slang for Cigarettes

Bogë may refer to:

Boge, Gotland, a settlement on the Swedish island of Gotland
Bogë, Kosovo
Bogë, Albania

See also
Boga (disambiguation)